Rhizosomichthys totae (sometimes known as Greasefish in English) is a species of catfish (order Siluriformes) of the family Trichomycteridae, and the only species of the genus Rhizosomichthys. This fish grew to about 13.8 centimetres (5.4 in) and was endemic to Colombia where it occurred in the Lake Tota basin. It is listed as a critically endangered (possibly extinct) species by the IUCN Red List.
The species was last seen in 1957, and only 10 specimens were ever found. The disappearance is possibly linked to the release of 100,000 imported rainbow trout eggs into Lake Tota in 1936. 

Specimens of R. totae are described as having 8 rings of connective fat encircling the body and two large sections of fat tissue on the posterior part of the back and head.  No other trichomycterid has comparable organization of adipose tissue.

References 

Trichomycteridae
Extinct animals of South America
Freshwater fish of Colombia
Endemic fauna of Colombia
Altiplano Cundiboyacense
Fish described in 1942
Fish extinctions since 1500